Apicius is the title of the oldest surviving Roman cookbook, usually said to have been compiled in the 4th or 5th century AD.

Apicius may also refer to:

 Apicius (1st century BC) - lived during the Roman Republic 
 Marcus Gavius Apicius - the second and most famous, lived at the time of the emperor Tiberius 
 Apicius (2nd century AD) - lived at the time of the Emperor Trajan 
 The name also occurs in the title Apici Excerpta ("Extracts from Apicius") of a completely different Latin cookbook attributed to Vinidarius
 Restaurant Apicius - Dutch Michelin-starred restaurant